Ultra Hockey is a video game developed and published by Konami for the arcade.

Gameplay
Ultra Hockey is a simple competitive hockey game as a tabletop arcade machine with an overhead view.

Reception
Next Generation reviewed the arcade version of the game, rating it three stars out of five, and stated that "Essentially an exact duplicate of Konami's own Five A Side Soccer, except using hockey players and an icy white background instead of a green one".

References

External links
 Ultra Hockey at Killer List of Videogames

Ice hockey video games